The French Rite is a Rite of Freemasonry that was founded in France, in 1786.

History
The French Rite is intimately linked to the birth of Freemasonry in France and was founded in France in 1786.  British exiles brought the Modern rite to France and this was little by little passed onto the French Rite. Though this hybrid form is no longer known as the French Rite, it sometimes takes that name to distinguish it from the Scottish Rites from which it was initially formed.  In order to guarantee that French Freemasonry would have a national dimension, the Grand Orient de France organised the standardisation of "Modern" hexagonal (or French, from the perceived shape of the country) rites from 1782 onwards, and in 1785 the model was fixed for the first three degrees in a "blue lodge", which showed a strong English influence in contrast to the Scottish Rites.  However, it was only in 1801 that the Grand Orient de France printed the rules of this rite under the title Régulateur du Maçon, containing several additions and amendments to the former version, which had circulated from lodge to lodge in discrete manuscript form.  The Rite underwent several further reforms, and in 1858 the "Murat French Rite" (returning to the foundations of the Constitutions of Anderson without making lasting change to the rite) was imposed.

As well as the sub-rites already mentioned, there is also a "French Rite of 1801".

In Adogmatic Freemasonry 
After the 1877 Great Schism, the Grand College of Rites of the Grand Orient de France decided on a new reform.  This took place in 1879 and removed from the French Rite any formulas with religious connotations (such as the reference to the Grand Architect of the Universe and the duties towards God).  An 1886 commission headed by Louis Aimable concluded an adogmatic form of the rite, giving it a hint of positivism — after this date the rite is known as the "Aimable French Rite".  It underwent less important reforms in 1907, and then remained unchanged until 1938.  In that year Arthur Groussier (Grand Master of the Grand Orient de France) began a new reform initiative in an attempt to return the rite to its roots after the sum of additions and suppressions which had rendered it hard-to-understand and soulless. The definitive version — known as the "Groussier French Rite" — was completed in 1955 under the authority of Paul Chevalier.

In the 1960s and 70s, several masons such as René Guilly sought the original essence of the French Rite and made a new attempt to reanimate its initiatory and symbolic character.  René Guilly was the prime force behind the creation of a chapter of the Traditional French Rite, a chapter which still exists today within the National French Lodge.  In 1974, another chapter was formed in Paris on the instigation of a member of the Traditional and Symbolic Grand Lodge of the Opéra.  Through its offshoots, the latter led to the creation of a sovereign college of the Traditional French Rite, within a multi-jurisdiction framework.

In Regular Freemasonry 

Other masons' research led them to Brazil and it was the Supreme Council of the Modern Rite for Brazil which finally accorded them a patent to establish a French Grand Chapter in 1989.  This was a rebirth of the "Re-established Modern French Rite" after 150 years' absence, under the name "Traditional French Rite" and purging all later or external additions, modifications and influences.  This makes it the closest rite to that practiced in France in the second half of the 18th century.  In the words of Roger Girard, "the specificity of the French Rite is exactly what no other rite has".

Practice

Jurisdictions
In continental freemasonry, 80% of lodges practising the French Rite belong to the Grand Orient of France, but it is also practised by some lodges in other jurisdictions such as the Grande Loge Traditionnelle et Symbolique Opéra, the Grande Loge Mixte de France and the Loge Nationale Française. It is also the official rite of the Grand Orient of Poland. In 1973, the GODF issued the patent of the French Rite to the Grande Loge Féminine de France, and so this jurisdiction developed a version of the Rite adapted to its specific needs.

In the regular Grande Loge Nationale Française, it is worked by approximately 10–15% of the lodges.

It has spread to Belgium, Luxembourg, Brazil, the Netherlands, Greece, Spain and Switzerland (and formerly in Louisiana), although outside France it is mainly a minority Rite (especially found in lodges founded by the Grand Orient of France).

Degrees
The French Rite system is a regime of seven grades or degrees:

In a "blue lodge":

 Apprentice
 Companion
  Master

Four orders:
 
 First order (4th degree): Secret Elect
 Second order (5th degree): Scottish Grand Elect
 Third order (6th degree): Knight of the Orient
 Fourth order (7th degree): Sovereign Rose-Cross Prince, Perfect Freemason, Grand Commander of the Temple

A fifth order has existed ever since the Rite's origins, and is first mentioned in the first version of its Regulations in 1801.  It is practised by the Grand Orient de France, the Grande Loge Nationale Française and the Women's General Grand Chapter of France.  Its main ritual (of the 80 rituals which Masons of this order have to study) is very close to that of the 28th Degree of the Ancient and Accepted Scottish Rite corresponding to the "Knight of the Sun".

Spirituality

The French Rite is often felt to be the most 'lay' rite of Freemasonry practiced within the Grand Orient de France, an adogmatic jurisdiction which removed such traditional elements as the Volume of the Sacred Law and all mention of the Grand Architect of the Universe from the rite.

In the form practiced by the regular Grande Loge Nationale Française, it is the rite most similar to that of the 1717 Premier Grand Lodge [of London], one of the possible founding rites of Freemasonry, perpetuating several fundamentals (such as the position of columns J and B and of the candlesticks around the lodge carpet, the 2 brief blows and one longer blow, the moving of the right foot) which the "Antient" lodge later changed.

See also
 List of Masonic Rites

References

External links
 General Grand Chapter of the GOdF 
  Grand Chapter of the Upper Degrees of the French Rite (Grand Priory of the Gauls) 
 French Grand Chapter of the GLNF 
 http://www.masonicdictionary.com/rites.html
 http://www.themasonictrowel.com/Articles/Symbolism/rituals_files/rituals_7_doors_to_freemasonry.htm

Masonic rites
Rite